Youngraad  is a 2018 Marathi coming of age film directed by Makrand Mane and produced by Phantom Films. Set in Nasik,  the film chronicles the life of four youngsters. The film's official trailer was launched on 19 June 2018 and the film was released theatrically on 6 July 2018.

Cast
 Vitthal Patil as	Bhallal Bhau
 Chaitanya Deore as Vikya		
 Jeevan Karalkar as Bappa
 Saurabh Padvi	as Antya
 Shiv Wagh as Monya
 Shireen Patil	as Teju
 Sharad Kelkar as Senapati
 Shashank Shende as Naamdev Chavan
 Savita Prabhune as Suryavanshi Bai
 Monika Chaudhari as Jyoti
 Shantanu Gangane

Plot
A story of coming of age in a regular low income middle class family in India; of vain attempts to swim against the tide; of desperately trying to find a way out once you find yourself being carried by the flow.

Music

References

Indian coming-of-age films
2010s Marathi-language films
Reliance Entertainment films
2010s coming-of-age films